Michael Tobin (1835–1908) was an Irish-born merchant and politician in Newfoundland. He represented Placentia and St. Mary's in the Newfoundland House of Assembly from 1882 to 1885.

He was born in Wexford and later came to Newfoundland. He was employed in the fishery supply business at St. John's and St. Mary's. His business ran into difficulties about the same time as he served in the Newfoundland assembly. He later was involved in another fishery supply business with a nephew J.J. Tobin; it was dissolved in 1893.

References 

Members of the Newfoundland and Labrador House of Assembly
1835 births
1908 deaths
Irish emigrants to pre-Confederation Newfoundland
Newfoundland Colony people